Fort Jackson is a historic masonry fort located  up river from the mouth of the Mississippi River in Plaquemines Parish, Louisiana. It was constructed as a coastal defense of New Orleans, between 1822 and 1832, and it was a battle site during the American Civil War.  It is a National Historic Landmark.  It was damaged by Hurricanes Katrina and Rita, and its condition is threatened. It is marked Battery Millar on some maps, for the Endicott era work built nearby it.

The older Fort St. Philip is located opposite of Fort Jackson on the eastern bank; this West Bank fort was constructed after the War of 1812 on the advice of Andrew Jackson, for whom it is named.

The fort was occupied off and on for various military purposes from its completion until after World War I, when it served as a training station. It is now a National Historic Landmark and historical museum owned and operated by Plaquemines Parish.

Fort Jackson was the site of the Battle of Forts Jackson and St. Philip from April 16 to April 28, 1862, during the American Civil War. The Confederate-controlled fort was besieged for 12 days by the fleet of U.S. Navy Flag Officer David Farragut. Fort Jackson fell on April 28 after the Union fleet bombarded it and then sailed past its guns. A mutiny against the officers and conditions then occurred and the fort fell to the Union. Union forces then went on to capture New Orleans.

Following the engagement, Fort Jackson was used as a Union prison. It was here that the French champagne magnate Charles Heidsieck was held for seven months on charges of spying.

Modern times
On November 9th, 1927 The state of Louisiana sold Fort Jackson as a surplus government property to Mr. and Mrs. H. J. Harvey, who later donated the property to the parish in 1960 in the hopes that the fort, and the 82 acres of land that it sits on, would be restored. The fort was declared a National Historic Landmark in 1960, and was also listed on the National Register of Historic Places in 1967. Plaquemines Parish Commission Council began renovations on the fort in 1961, with the National Park Service stating that "The fort area
had become a jungle with mud-filled tunnels infested with snakes and flooded with water". In the 1960s, Leander Perez threatened to turn Fort St. Philip into a prison for advocates of desegregation ("outside agitators") who entered the Parish.

The fort site was later opened as a park with only the outside grounds open for visitors. The interior of the fort is open to the public  on occasion, The Fort Jackson Museum is open to the public, but it is not at the fort site.

Storm Damage
Due to the location of Fort Jackson, it is vulnerable to the strong winds, pelting rain, and decimating storm surges from storms ranging from 'rough weather' to 'deadly hurricanes'. The fort was inundated with 20 feet of water from both Hurricane Betsy, a category 4 storm, in September 1965, and Hurricane Camille, a category 5 storm, in August 1969.

The fort was badly damaged by Hurricane Katrina's storm surge in 2005. Between Katrina and Hurricane Rita the following month, much of the fort sat under water for up to six weeks. Many of the historic exhibits in the fort were destroyed, and the fort itself suffered structural damage.

Other Uses
Since 1970, The grounds of Fort Jackson have been the site of both the Plaquemines Parish Fair and Orange Festival.

The fort was used to treat oily birds in the early weeks of the Deepwater Horizon oil spill.  The treatment facility was moved on July 4, 2010, to Hammond, Louisiana, in order to make it less vulnerable to hurricanes.

See also
National Register of Historic Places listings in Plaquemines Parish, Louisiana
List of National Historic Landmarks in Louisiana
Jackson Barracks, New Orleans

References

External links
Fort Tours: Fort Jackson
Civil War Album: History of Fort Jackson
 Forts Jackson and St. Philip Collection, 1861-1862 at The Historic New Orleans Collection 

Jackson (Louisiana), Fort
Jackson
National Historic Landmarks in Louisiana
Museums in Plaquemines Parish, Louisiana
American Civil War museums in Louisiana
Buildings and structures in Plaquemines Parish, Louisiana
Jackson
1823 establishments in Louisiana
National Register of Historic Places in Plaquemines Parish, Louisiana
American Civil War on the National Register of Historic Places